My Favourite Hits may refer to:

My Favourite Hits (Hariharan album)
My Favourite Hits, album by Aaron Carter
My Favourite Hits, Miriam Yeung discography